Dayton is a city in and the county seat of Columbia County, Washington, United States. The population was 2,526 at the 2010 census.

History

Dayton was founded in the 1860s. A town site plat was filed by Jesse N. and Elizabeth Day on November 23, 1871. The city was officially incorporated on November 10, 1881, and was named for Jesse Day. Dayton has the oldest train depot in Washington state, dating from 1881, and the oldest continuously used courthouse, operating since 1887. The historic community of Baileysburg was situated about one mile southeast of Dayton, at the junction of North Touchet and South Touchet Roads.

In the 1980s and 1990s, the town underwent a $3 million restoration program, repairing the historic depot and historic courthouse, adding pedestrian amenities to Main Street, and creating a National Historic District.

Geography and climate
Dayton is located at  (46.319608, -117.977699).

The Touchet River runs through Dayton.

Dayton has a Mediterranean climate (Köppen Csb) with hot summers (though nights are pleasantly cool) and chilly, though not severe, winters with only very moderate snowfall. Dayton's winter climate is somewhat milder than most of eastern Washington. Precipitation is moderate for most of the year except for a dry period between July and September, at which time major wildfires are very common in the region due to the hot days and very low humidity.

Demographics

2010 census
At the 2010 census there were 2,526 people, 1,082 households, and 670 families living in the city. The racial makeup of the city was 91.6% White, 0.4% African American, 1.9% Native American, 0.6% Asian, 0.6% Pacific Islander, 1.8% from other races, and 3.2% from two or more races. Hispanic or Latino of any race were 7.1%.

Of the 1,082 households 25.7% had children under the age of 18 living with them, 47.0% were married couples living together, 10.8% had a female householder with no husband present, 4.2% had a male householder with no wife present, and 38.1% were non-families. 33.1% of households were one person and 15.8% were one person aged 65 or older. The average household size was 2.27 and the average family size was 2.85.

The median age was 46.3 years. 21.6% of residents were under the age of 18; 6.2% were between the ages of 18 and 24; 20.1% were from 25 to 44; 30% were from 45 to 64; and 22.2% were 65 or older. The gender makeup of the city was 49.0% male and 51.0% female.

2000 census
At the 2000 census, there were 2,655 people, 1,081 households, and 695 families living in the city. The population density was 1,803.0 people per square mile (697.3/km). There were 1,181 housing units at an average density of 802.0 per square mile (310.2/km). The racial makeup of the city was 92.58% White, 0.30% African American, 1.05% Native American, 0.49% Asian, 0.04% Pacific Islander, 3.54% from other races, and 2.00% from two or more races. Hispanic or Latino of any race were 8.17% of the population.

Of the 1,081 households 30.6% had children under the age of 18 living with them, 51.4% were married couples living together, 9.5% had a female householder with no husband present, and 35.7% were non-families. 31.9% of households were one person and 15.4% were one person aged 65 or older. The average household size was 2.39 and the average family size was 3.02.

The age distribution was 25.8% under the age of 18, 7.8% from 18 to 24, 23.1% from 25 to 44, 24.5% from 45 to 64, and 18.9% 65 or older. The median age was 40 years. For every 100 females, there were 91.6 males. For every 100 females age 18 and over, there were 90.1 males.

The median household income was $31,409 and the median family income  was $40,714. Males had a median income of $31,395 versus $21,339 for females. The per capita income for the city was $15,925. About 10.3% of families and 13.3% of the population were below the poverty line, including 17.0% of those under age 18 and 9.6% of those age 65 or over.

Notable residents
Dmitri Borgmann, writer
Frank Finkel, claimed lone survivor of the Battle of the Little Bighorn
Frederick Gilbreath, United States Army General
Robert Shields, diarist
Jim Watkins, businessman

References

External links

 Dayton Chamber of Commerce
 Pictures of Dayton and Columbia County

Cities in Washington (state)
Cities in Columbia County, Washington
County seats in Washington (state)
1871 establishments in Washington Territory

bg:Дейтън